Baishazhou is a subdistrict of Wangcheng District, Changsha, Hunan. It is located on the western bank of the Xiang River. The subdistrict is bordered by Dazehu subdistrict to the south, Jinshanqiao subdistricts to the west, Wushan Subdistrict to the north, Xiufeng subdistrict of Kaifu District and Dingziwan subdistrict across the Xiang river to the east.

The Baishazhou subdistrict was formed by a partition of Xincheng on August 29, 2012.

History
A its name suggests, it was once an island, but eventually became connected to the mainland due to the shifting course of the Yangtze River.

Baishazhou was formed by the revocation of Xingcheng (and setting up three new subdistricts) in 2012. Xingcheng was formed by Dahu and Gushan in 1995. there were 22 villages and two residential communities in 1997.

In July 2012, Xingcheng was changed from a town as a subdistrict. On August 28, 2012, Xingcheng was divided into three subdistricts, they are Baishazhou, Dazehu and Yueliangdao subdistricts. 
 The Baisha subdistrict contains Maqiaohe, Tengfei and huangtian three villages; 
 The Dazehu subdistrict contains Dongma residential community, Xitang, Huilong and Nantang villages; 
 The Yueliangdao subdistrict contains Yueliangdao residential community, Yinxing, Zhonghualing and Daigongmiao villages.

References

See also
 Yingwuzhou

Township-level divisions of Wangcheng
Wangcheng